Hemigomphus heteroclytus is a species of dragonfly of the family Gomphidae, 
known as the stout vicetail. 
It is a small, black and yellow dragonfly, endemic to eastern Australia, where it inhabits streams that reduce to trickles in summer.

Hemigomphus heteroclytus is similar to Hemigomphus gouldii, the southern vicetail, also found in eastern Australia.

Gallery

See also
 List of Odonata species of Australia

References

Gomphidae
Odonata of Australia
Endemic fauna of Australia
Taxa named by Edmond de Sélys Longchamps
Insects described in 1854